Bolesławowo may refer to the following places:
Bolesławowo, Greater Poland Voivodeship (west-central Poland)
Bolesławowo, Masovian Voivodeship (east-central Poland)
Bolesławowo, Człuchów County in Pomeranian Voivodeship (north Poland)
Bolesławowo, Starogard County in Pomeranian Voivodeship (north Poland)